Jorge Rolando (born 22 November 1906, date of death unknown) was a Uruguayan fencer. He competed in the team sabre event at the 1936 Summer Olympics.

References

External links
 

1906 births
Year of death missing
Sportspeople from Montevideo
Uruguayan male sabre fencers
Olympic fencers of Uruguay
Fencers at the 1936 Summer Olympics